The Lamont Harp, or Clàrsach Lumanach (also known as the Caledonian Harp or Lude Harp) is a Scottish Clarsach currently displayed in the National Museum of Scotland. It is believed to date back to the 15th century, and to have originated in Argyll. Along with the Queen Mary Harp and the Trinity College harp, it is one of the only three surviving medieval Gaelic harps.

History 
The Lamont harp was presented to the Robertson family of Lude 1460-1464 as part of a marriage dowry to Charles Robertson of Lude (or of Clune). The Lamont Harp was handed down in the Robertson family and remained at Lude in Perthshire until 1805, when both the Lamont Harp and the Queen Mary Harp were sent to Edinburgh. In 1880 both clarsachs were deposited by a John Stewart of Dalguise in the National Museum of Edinburgh now the Museum of Scotland, where they remain to this day.

Appearance 
The Lamont Harp stands 95 cm tall and 42.5 cm wide and is considerably larger than the 2 other medieval harps (Queen Mary and Trinity harps), but smaller than other surviving Gaelic Harps.  The Lamont harp has very little decorative carving when compared to the other surviving examples, and was constructed with fine metal fittings, notably fox styled metal reinforcements between the pillar (Lamhchrann) and neck of the instrument, the metal head is beaten to imitate a gem setting and the square drives of the tuning pins are fitted to resemble cloves or rosebuds.
The Lamont harp bears the inscription “Al Stew(art) of Clunie his Harp 165(0)” although this is too late a date for the original construction of the harp this may relate to the repair. The wood has been identified as hornbeam or English walnut although the pillar has distorted over time and the T-section reinforcement is shorter than on other early Gaelic harps, and does seem to have happened at the ends where the pillar is wide but thin.

In 1805 both the Lamont Harp and Queen Mary Harp were exhibited to the Highland society of Scotland and a history was commissioned and published by the author John Gunn in 1870.

Replicas 
Replicas of the Lamont Harp have been attempted by many modern harpmakers, one of the difficulties being establishing the original form and string lengths due to the present distorted state of the instrument, and the natural desire to avoid the catastrophic fate of the original. It may be that during its lifetime the Lamont harp was re-strung with heavier, possibly brass wires, in order to change its volume or tone. (see Karen Loomis' work, in Galpin Society Journal) It is speculated that the original stringing used gold wire in the bass, to achieve satisfactory tone, though this is still somewhat controversial. Ann Heymann and others have successfully strung medieval harps with gold bass strings. Replicas or reproductions have been produced by amongst others, David Kortier, Jay Witcher, Robert Evans and Guy Flockhart, some closer than others to the original, and some with gold and silver wire strings, and are currently played by harpers such as Alison Kinnaird and Javier Sainz, and can be heard on their recordings and in the Museum of Scotland. Student replicas based on measurements from the original are available from the Historical Harp Society of Ireland.

References

External links

15th century in music
15th century in Scotland
History of Argyll and Bute
Collections of the National Museums of Scotland
Culture of medieval Scotland
Scottish music
Individual harps